Rana al-Tonsi is an Egyptian writer and poet.

Early life 
Al-Tonsi was born on 27 November 1981 in Cairo and attended the American University in Cairo. She started writing when she was young and published her first book before she was 20 years old. Her first collection, The House From Which Music Came was published to critical acclaim.

Career 
Al-Tonsi's writing addresses themes of violence, rebellion, motherhood and intimacy.

Selected publications
Since her first publication, works include:

 A Rose for the Last Days (Merit House, Cairo, 2002)
 A Homeland Called Desire (Merit House, Cairo, 2005) 
 Short History  (Arab Renaissance House, Beirut, 2006)
 Kisses (Merit House, Cairo, 2010)
 Happiness (Prut, 2012) 
 When I'm Not in the Air, Poetry (Jamal Publications, Beirut, 2014)
 The Book of Games (Orientals for Publishing, Cairo, 2015)
 Index of Fear (Dar Al-Ain Publishing, Cairo, 2018)

Reception 
Al-Tonsi is viewed as an important voice in the middle-generation of women poets who have published since the 1980s.

The late Egyptian poet Ahmed Fouad, the star of her third work, "A Homeland Called Desire", said that Rana Al-Tonsi "carries the concerns of an orphan generation rejecting the experience of the fathers who inherited the homeland." Egyptian critic Salah Fadl, says of Rana's Tunisian Poem that it "does not rely on a continuous narrative, for a single story ... but rather composes fragments of spaced parts … It ranges from the outside to the self, from sense to abstract morality ..."

References 

1981 births
Living people
Egyptian women poets
21st-century Egyptian poets
21st-century Egyptian women writers